Johann Jakob d'Annone (b, 12 July 1728 Basel, d. 18 September 1804 Basel.) was a Swiss educator, scientist and lawyer. He graduated in Philosophy and Lawfrom the University of Basel in 1752. He then taught Roman law, numismatics and natural sciences (especially mineralogy) at that University between 1759 and 1760, he was appointed professor of eloquence in 1766  and of law from 1779. He was the rector of the University of Basel from 1782 to 83 and, again in 1794-95. He was made dean of the Faculty of Law eight times. He became the legal adviser to the city of Basel in 1774 and was an authority on antiquities and Roman artefacts, He started an important collection of fossils and minerals, as well as a valuable numismatic collection. In addition, he founded a library comprising 10,000 volumes.

References

Swiss mineralogists
Swiss numismatists